Edmondia may refer to:
 Edmondia (plant), a plant genus in the family Asteraceae
 Edmondia (bivalve), an extinct bivalve genus in the family Edmondiidae and the order Anomalodesmata